The Duchy of Löwenberg or Duchy of Lwowek was one of the Duchies of Silesia established in 1281 as a division of the Duchy of Jawor. The duchy of Lwowek was ruled by the Silesian Piast, Bernard the Lightsome, with its capital at Lwowek Slaski in Lower Silesia, which gained town rights in 1217.

Geography 
The original duchy was located in the south-western part of Lower Silesia on the current lands of Lwowek Sląski County with the southern part of the duchy covering most of the modern Jelenia Gora County. Lwowek Slaski was the biggest town (around 11.000 inhabitants.) and also the capital of the duchy. The town of Lwowek had its own mint and coin. The town had double walls and two big churches. Some other important towns located within the lands of the duchy were: Wlen, Gryfow Sląski and Jelenia Gora. The main factor of the rapid development of the area was gold surrounding Lwowek Slaski and the trade road Via Regia. Some sources say that a few tons of gold were excavated in the Middle Ages from the mines around Lwowek. After the exhaustion of the gold mines the citizens started to earn from cloth producing, weaving, crafts, trade and sandstone processing.

History 
Bernard the Lightsome was the only ruler of the duchy of Lwowek. He was the youngest son of the Silesian prince Boleslaw II Rogatka and Hedwig, daughter of Henry I, Count of Anhalt. He became the ruler 3 years after his father died, in 1281 when Bernards' brother Bolko I the Strict partitioned the Duchy of Jawor and granted him western part of the duchy with its capital in Lwowek Slaski. The Duchy of Jawor and the duchy of Lwowek cooperated as brothers ruled in the two duchies. Bernard died unmarried and childless in 1286 and because of a lack of heirs the duchy of Lwowek was annexed and ruled by the Duchy of Jawor again by Bernard's brother Bolko I.

Castles 
There were several castles guarding the lands of the duchy. The most important were those located in Wlen, Gryfow and Lwowek.

Lwowek Castle 
Lwowek Castle was a medieval castle in Lwowek built to protect the inhabitants of the town. It was built at the beginning of the 13th century as a seat of Silesian princes. It was located in the southern part of the town, along the town walls. The founder of the castle was probably Henry I the Bearded. The castle was often visited by princes of Jawor and Swidnica-Jawor (for example Bolko I the Strict). The castle was partly destroyed during a fire in 1381 but the town council decided to rebuild the castle and in 1389 the renovation was complete. Since 1444 the castle was no longer a public property. The castle was destroyed again in 1475 after a huge fire and has never been rebuilt again. Now in the place of the castle stands the oldest brewery in Poland which started producing beer in 1209. The only remains of the castle are the sandstone foundations in the brewery's basement.

Gryf Castle 

Gryf Castle is located in Proszowka near Gryfow. The first owner of the castle was Konrad II the Hunchback.

Wlen Castle 
Wlen Castle is located in Łupki near Wleń. 
There were also many medieval guard towers along Via Regia road.

Gallery

References 

States and territories established in the 1280s
Duchies of Silesia
1281 establishments
1281 establishments in Europe